Siyabonga Dube (born 12 October 1995) is a South African soccer player who played as a defender for South African Premier Division side Lamontville Golden Arrows.

References

1995 births
Living people
Sportspeople from Durban
Soccer players from KwaZulu-Natal
South African soccer players
Association football defenders
Lamontville Golden Arrows F.C. players
South African Premier Division players
National First Division players